The Denmark Open, or formerly known as Danish Open, is an annual badminton tournament held in Denmark and organized by Badminton Denmark.

The Denmark Open was part of the BWF Super Series Premier from 2011 to 2017. BWF categorised it as one of the five BWF World Tour Super 750 events per the BWF events structure since 2018.

History 
The tournament started in 1936 and it is now the world's second oldest badminton tournament. It was interrupted by World War II and was on hiatus from 1956 through 1964. It seeks to draw the top players from around the World. The tournament is usually played in late October each year.

Locations 
Eleven locations have been chosen to host the tournament. The 2007 and 2008 tournaments were held in Arena Fyn in Odense. Since 2008, the tournaments have been held in Odense.

1936–1939, 1946–1985: Copenhagen
1990: Aabenraa
1991: Solrød municipality
1986, 1992: Aalborg
1989, 1993: Højbjerg
1987, 1994: Esbjerg
1996: Middelfart
1997–1999: Vejle
2000–2002: Farum
2003–2006: Aarhus
1988, 1995, 2007–present: Odense

Previous champions

Performances by nation

References

External links 
Official website 

 
1935 establishments in Denmark
Recurring sporting events established in 1935